The term Pteridospermatophyta (or "seed ferns" or "Pteridospermatopsida") is a polyphyletic group of extinct seed-bearing plants (spermatophytes). The earliest fossil evidence for plants of this type is the genus Elkinsia of the late Devonian age. They flourished particularly during the Carboniferous and Permian periods.  Pteridosperms declined during the Mesozoic Era and had mostly disappeared by the end of the Cretaceous Period, though some pteridosperm-like plants seem to have survived into Eocene times, based on fossil finds in Tasmania.

With regard to the enduring utility of this division, many palaeobotanists still use the pteridosperm grouping in an informal sense to refer to the seed plants that are not angiosperms, coniferoids (conifers or cordaites), ginkgophytes or cycadophytes (cycads or bennettites). This is particularly useful for extinct seed plant groups whose systematic relationships remain speculative, as they can be classified as pteridosperms with no valid implications being made as to their systematic affinities. Also, from a purely curatorial perspective the term pteridosperms is a useful shorthand for describing the fern-like fronds that were probably produced by seed plants, which are commonly found in many Palaeozoic and Mesozoic fossil floras.

History of classification
The concept of pteridosperms goes back to the late 19th century when palaeobotanists came to realise that many Carboniferous fossils resembling fern fronds had anatomical features more reminiscent of the modern-day seed plants, the cycads. In 1899 the German palaeobotanist Henry Potonié coined the term "Cycadofilices" ("cycad-ferns") for such fossils, suggesting that they were a group of non-seed plants intermediate between the ferns and cycads.  Shortly afterwards, the British palaeobotanists Frank Oliver and Dukinfield Henry Scott (with the assistance of Oliver's student at the time, Marie Stopes) made the critical discovery that some of these fronds (genus Lyginopteris) were associated with seeds (genus Lagenostoma) that had identical and very distinctive glandular hairs, and concluded that both fronds and seeds belonged to the same plant. Soon, additional evidence came to light suggesting that seeds were also attached to the Carboniferous fern-like fronds Dicksonites, Neuropteris and Aneimites.  Initially it was still thought that they were "transitional fossils" intermediate between the ferns and cycads, and especially in the English-speaking world they were referred to as "seed ferns" or "pteridosperms".  Today, despite being regarded by most palaeobotanists as only distantly related to ferns, these spurious names have nonetheless established themselves. Nowadays, four orders of Palaeozoic seed plants tend to be referred to as pteridosperms: Lyginopteridales, Medullosales, Callistophytales and Peltaspermales.

Their discovery attracted considerable attention at the time, as the pteridosperms were the first extinct group of vascular plants to be identified solely from the fossil record.  In the 19th century the Carboniferous Period was often referred to as the "Age of Ferns" but these discoveries during the first decade of the 20th century made it clear that the "Age of Pteridosperms" was perhaps a better description.

During the 20th century the concept of pteridosperms was expanded to include various Mesozoic groups of seed plants with fern-like fronds, such as the Corystospermaceae.  Some palaeobotanists also included seed plant groups with entire leaves such as the Glossopteridales and Gigantopteridales, which was stretching the concept.  In the context of modern phylogenetic models, the groups often referred to as pteridosperms appear to be liberally spread across a range of clades, and many palaeobotanists today would regard pteridosperms as little more than a paraphyletic 'grade-group' with no common lineage. One of the few characters that may unify the group is that the ovules were borne in a cupule, a group of enclosing branches, but this has not been confirmed for all "pteridosperm" groups.

Phylogeny
An alternative phylogeny of spermatophytes based on the work by Novíkov & Barabaš-Krasni 2015 with plant taxon authors from Anderson, Anderson & Cleal 2007 showing the relationship of extinct clades.

Taxonomy

 Family ?†Nystroemiaceae Wang & Pfefferkorn 2009
 Order ?†Alexiales Anderson & Anderson (2003)
 Family †Alexiaceae Anderson & Anderson (2003)
 Order ?†Calamopityales Němejc (1963) [Buteoxylales Taylor & Taylor (1992)]
 Family †Calamopityaceae (Solm. (1896)) Scott (1909) [Buteoxylaceae Barnard & Long (1973); Stenomyelaceae Scott (1923)]
 Order ?†Erdtmanithecales Friis and Pedersen (1996)
 Family †Erdtmanithecaceae Friis and Pedersen (1996)
 Order ?†Hlatimbiales Anderson & Anderson (2003)
 Family †Hlatimbiaceae Anderson & Anderson (2003)
 Order †Umkomasiales Doweld (2001) [Corystospermales; Ptilozamitales (Němejc 1950)]
 Family †Angaropeltidaceae Doweld (2001) [Cardiolepidaceae Meyen 1977]
 Family †Umkomasiaceae Petriella (1981) (Corystospermaceae (Thomas (1933)) Stockey & Rothwel nom. illeg.; Zuberiaceae Němejc (1968); Pachypteridaceae de Zigno; Ptilozamitaceae Němejc (1950)]
 Class ?†Arberiopsida Doweld (2001) [Clealopsida; Dicranophyllopsida Němejc 1968]
 Order †Dicranophyllales Meyen (1984) emend. Anderson, Anderson & Cleal (2007)
 Family †Dicranophyllaceae Němejc (1959) ex Archangelsky & Cúneo (1990)
 Order †Aberiales Meyen (1978) ex Meyen (1984)
 Family †Schmeissneriaceae Zhou (1997)
 Family †Arberiaceae (Rigby (1972) Anderson & Anderson (1985)
 Class †Moresnetiopsida Doweld (2001) [Moresnetiophyta Doweld (2001); Elkinsiophytina]
 Order †Tetrastichiales Němejc (1968)
 Family †Tetrastichiaceae Němejc (1968)
 Order †Pullarithecales Doweld (1998)
 Family †Gnetopsidaceae Doweld (2001)
 Family †Pullarithecaceae Doweld (1998
 Family †Calathiopsidaceae Doweld (2001)
 Family †Austrocalyxaceae Vega & Archangelsky (2001)
 Order †Moresnetiales Doweld (2001) [Elkinsiales Rothwell, Scheckler & Gillespie (1989); Hydraspermatales Krassilov (1989)]
 Family †Eurystomataceae Long (1975)
 Family †Eospermatacesidae Long (1975)
 Family †Moresnetiaceae Němejc (1963) emend. Anderson, Anderson & Cleal (2007) [Genomospermaceae Long (1975); Elkinsiaceae Rothwell, Scheckler & Gillespie (1989) ex Cleal; Hydraspermaceae]
 Class †Lyginopteridopsida Novák (1961) emend. Anderson, Anderson & Cleal (2007) [Lagenostomatopsida Cleal (1993); Lyginopteridophyta Doweld (2001); Lyginopteridophytina]
 Order ?†Hexapterospermales Doweld (2001)
 Family †Colpospermaceae Doweld (2001)
 Family †Hexapterospermaceae Doweld (2001) nom cons. [Potonieaceae (Halle (1933)) Remy & Remy (1959) emend. Anderson & Anderson (2007)]
 Order †Lyginopteridales (Corsin (1960)) Havlena (1961) [Lagenostomatales Seward ex Long (1975); Lyginodendrales Nemejc (1968); Sphenopteridales Schimper 1869]
 Family †Angaranthaceae Naugolnykh (2012)
 Family †Heterangiaceae Němejc (1950) nom. nud.
 Family †Physostomataceae Long (1975)
 Family †Lyginopteridaceae Potonie (1900) emend. Anderson, Anderson & Cleal (2007) [Lagenostomataceae Long (1975; Pityaceae Scott (1909); Lyginodendraceae Scott (1909); Sphenopteridaceae Gopp. (1842); Pseudopecopteridaceae Lesquereux (1884); Megaloxylaceae Scott (1909), nom. rej.; Rhetinangiaceae Scott (1923), nom. rej.; Tetratmemaceae Němejc (1968)]
 Class †Pachytestopsida Doweld (2001) [Medullosopsida nom. nud.; Trigonocarpopsida nom. nud.; Medullosae]
 Order †Codonospermales Doweld (2001)
 Family †Codonospermaceae Doweld (2001) emend. Anderson, Anderson & Cleal (2007)
 Order †Pachytestales Doweld (2001) (Medullosales Corsin (1960); Trigonocarpales Seward 1917 nom. inv.; Neuropteridales Schimper (1869); Rhexoxylales]
 Family †Potonieaceae Halle (1933) emend. Anderson, Anderson & Cleal (2007) [Rachivestitaceae; Perispermaceae]
 Family †Polylophospermaceae Doweld (2001) emend. Anderson, Anderson & Cleal (2007)
 Family †Stephanospermaceae Doweld (2001) emend. Anderson, Anderson & Cleal (2007)
 Family †Trigonocarpaceae Göppert (1842)
 Family †Neuropteridaceae Laveine (1966) [incl. Odontopteridaceae Trapl (1926) sensu Corsin (1960); Neurodontopteridaceae Laveine (1966)]
 Family †Pachytestaceae Doweld (2001) (Medullosaceae (Gopp. (1842)) Sterzel (1896); Whittleseyaceae Remy & Remy (1959); Protoblechnaceae Wagner (1967); Neuralethospermaceae Laveine (1967))
 Family †Callipteridaceae Corsin ex Wagner (1965) [Callipteridiaceae; Callipteraceae]
 Family †Alethopteridaceae (Lesquereux (1884)) Corsin (1960) emend. Anderson, Anderson & Cleal (2007)
 Family †Cyclopteridaceae Corsin ex Wagner (1964)
 Class †Callistophytopsida [Callistophytina]
 Order †Callistophytales Rothwell (1981) emend. Anderson, Anderson & Cleal (2007) [Poroxylales Němejc (1968)] 
 Family †Cornucarpaceae Doweld (2001) [Eremopteridaceae]
 Family †Callistophytaceae Stidd & Hall (1970), nom. cons. [Mariopteridaceae Němejc (1968); Callospermariaceae Long (1975)]
 Class †Peltaspermopsida Doweld (2001) [Peltaspermidae Němejc (1968); Psygmophyllopsida Koidzumi (1939)]
 Order †Sporophyllitales Doweld (2001)
 Family †Sporophyllitaceae Doweld (2001)
 Family †Leuthardtiaceae Doweld (2001)
 Order †Trichopityales Doweld (2001) [Psygmophyllales Nakai (1943)]
 Family †Psygmophyllaceae Zalessky (1937) emend. Naugolnykh
 Family †Syniopteridaceae Petrescu & Dragastan (1981)
 Family †Trichopityaceae Němejc (1968) [Florin emend.]
 Order †Peltaspermales Taylor (1981) [Lepidopteridales Němejc (1968)]
 Family †Autuniaceae Doweld (2001)
 Family †Peltaspermaceae (Thomas (1933)) Pilger & Melchoir (1954)) [Compsopteridaceae Petrescu & Dragastan (1981); Cycadopteridaceae Laguzen (1887); Thinnfeldiaceae Zimmerman (1959); Lepidopteridaceae Němejc (1968)]
 Family †Vetlugospermaceae Naugolnykh (2012)
 Class †Phasmatocycadopsida Doweld (2001)
 Order †Phasmatocycadales Doweld (2001) [Taeniopteridales]
 Family †Phasmatocycadaceae Doweld (2001) [Spermopteridaceae Doweld (2001)]
 Order †Gigantopteridales Li & Yao (1983) [Gigantonomiales Meyen (1987)]
 Family †Emplectopteridaceae Wagner (1967)
 Family †Gigantopteridaceae Koidzumi (1936) [Cardioglossaceae Koidzumi ex Jongmans (1958); Gigantonomiaceae Meyen (1987)]
 Class †Pentoxylopsida Pant ex Doweld (2001) [Pentoxylophytina Lemoigne (1988); Pentoxyla]
 Order †Pentoxylales Pilger & Melchior (1954)
 Family †Lindthecaceae Anderson & Anderson (2003)
 Family †Pentoxylaceae Pilger & Melchior (1954) [Pentoxyleae Sahni (1948)]
 Class †Dictyopteridiopsida Doweld (2001) [Ottokariopsida Anderson & Anderson (2007); Glossopteridopsida Plumstead (1956)]
 Family †Gangamopteridaceae Nicholson & Lydekker (1889)
 Order †Dictyopteridiales McLoughlin ex Doweld (2001) [Ottokariales Anderson & Anderson (1985)]
 Family †Breyteniaceae Doweld (2001)
 Family †Dictyopteridiaceae Rigby (1978) [Ottokariaceae Anderson & Anderson (1985); Scutaceae Rigby (1978), nom. illeg.]
 Order †Lidgettoniales Doweld (2001)
 Family †Denkaniaceae Doweld (2001)
 Family †Parthaceae Doweld (2001)
 Family †Lidgettoniaceae Anderson & Anderson (1985)
 Order †Rigbyales Doweld (2001) (Glossopteridales Luber & Schwedov (1963), nom. rej.]
 Family †Rigbyaceae Anderson & Anderson (1985) (Glossopteridaceae (Trapl (1926)) Zimmermann (1930), nom rej.] 
 Class †Cycadeoideopsida Scott (1923) [Cycadeoideophyta Taylor (1981); Cycadeoideidae Němejc (1968); Bennettitopsida Engler (1897); Bennettitophyta Kravtsov & Poljarnaja (1995); Bennettitidae Davitashvili (1949); Cycadoidea]
 Order †Fredlindiales Anderson & Anderson (2003)
 Family †Fredlindiaceae Anderson & Anderson (2003)
 Order †Cycadeoideales Berry (1920) [Bennettitales (Engler (1892)) Schaffn.; Williamsoniales Berry (1920); Wielandiales Nemejc (1950) nom. nud. ]
 Family †Benneticarpaceae Anderson & Anderson
 Family †Laurozamitiaceae Anderson & Anderson
 Family †Macrotaeniopteridaceae Bock 1969
 Family †Sturianthaceae Doweld (2001) [Sturiellaceae Němejc]
 Family †Varderkloeftiaceae Anderson & Anderson
 Family †Westersheimiaceae Němejc (1968)
 Family †Williamsoniaceae (Carruthers (1870)) Nathorst (1943)
 Family †Williamsoniellaceae Nakai (1943) [Wielandiellaceae (Novak (1954)) Němejc (1968)]
 Family †Cycadeoideaceae R. Br. ex Wieland (1908) [Bennettitaceae Engler (1892); Pterophyllaceae Nakai (1943)]
 Class †Caytoniopsida Thomas ex Frenguelli (1946) [Caytoniophytina Doweld (2001); Caytonia]
 Order †Caytoniales Gothan (1932)
 Family †Caytoniaceae (Thomas (1925)) Kräusel (1926)
 Class †Axelrodiopsida Anderson & Anderson
 Order †Axelrodiales Anderson & Anderson (2007)
 Family †Zamiostrobacea Anderson & Anderson (2007)
 Family †Axelrodiaceae Anderson & Anderson (2007)

References

External links 
  Seed fern paleontology
  Seed ferns

 
Plant divisions
Prehistoric plants
Devonian plants
Carboniferous plants
Permian plants
Triassic plants
Jurassic plants
Cretaceous plants
Paleocene plants
Eocene plants
Devonian first appearances
Eocene extinctions
Paraphyletic groups